In queueing theory, a discipline within the mathematical theory of probability, a Markovian arrival process (MAP or MArP) is a mathematical model for the time between job arrivals to a system. The simplest such process is a Poisson process where the time between each arrival is exponentially distributed.

The processes were first suggested by Neuts in 1979.

Definition

A Markov arrival process is defined by two matrices D0 and D1 where elements of D0 represent hidden transitions and elements of D1 observable transitions. The block matrix Q below is a transition rate matrix for a continuous-time Markov chain.

The simplest example is a Poisson process where D0 = −λ and D1 = λ where there is only one possible transition, it is observable and occurs at rate λ. For Q to be a valid transition rate matrix, the following restrictions apply to the Di

Special cases

Markov-modulated Poisson process 

The Markov-modulated Poisson process or MMPP where m Poisson processes are switched between by an underlying continuous-time Markov chain. If each of the m Poisson processes has rate λi and the modulating continuous-time Markov has  m × m transition rate matrix R, then the MAP representation is

Phase-type renewal process

The phase-type renewal process is a Markov arrival process with phase-type distributed sojourn between arrivals. For example, if an arrival process has an interarrival time distribution PH with an exit vector denoted , the arrival process has generator matrix,

Batch Markov arrival process
The batch Markovian arrival process (BMAP) is a generalisation of the Markovian arrival process by allowing more than one arrival at a time.  The homogeneous case has rate matrix,

An arrival of size  occurs every time a transition occurs in the sub-matrix .

and

Fitting

A MAP can be fitted using an expectation–maximization algorithm.

Software
 KPC-toolbox a library of MATLAB scripts to fit a MAP to data.

See also

Rational arrival process

References

Queueing theory
Markov processes